Emma Young is a science and health journalist and author. She has a degree in psychology from the University of Durham and 20 years’ experience working on titles including the Guardian, the Sydney Morning Herald and New Scientist, for which she worked as a senior online reporter in London and Australasian Editor in Sydney. Now employed by the British Psychological Society as a Staff Writer, she also freelance articles and writes books.

Novels
Young is the author of the STORM series, a series that includes the following novels.

 STORM: The Infinity Code (2007)
 STORM: The Ghost Machine (2007)
 STORM: The Black Sphere (2008)
 STORM: The Viper Club (2008)
 STORM: The Death Web (2009)

The series follows a group of highly intelligent teenagers who band together to form STORM (Science and Technology to Over-Rule Misery) a covert organisation who use their brainpower to rid the world of various evil threats.

The books incorporate a large element of high-tech gadgetry and science. These plot elements are based in fact, as the author states at the end of each book, along with a summary of the genuine research and inventions which inspire her writing.

References

External links 
 Book homepage
 New Scientist homepage

Living people
Australian science writers
Year of birth missing (living people)
Australian women novelists
Science journalists
Alumni of Durham University